Oleksandr Pyshchur (born 29 January 1981) is a Ukrainian former football forward.

Career

Volyn Lutsk
Pyshchur was the top goalscorer in Ukrainian First League for Volyn Lutsk in the 2008-09 season with 24 goals (4 penalties). After transferring to Ružomberok he became the team's top scorer as well with 11 goals in 2009–10 season and dividing the fourth place with three other top scorers of the Slovakian Top League.

After successful stint as captain of Volyn Lutsk Pyshchur transferred to Tavriya Simferopol.

Bunyodkor
In February 2013, he moved to Bunyodkor (he had been out on loan to Obolon Kyiv; but that club dissolved itself in February 2013. Pyshchur's debut for Bunyodkor was on 27 February 2013 in 2013 AFC Champions League away match against Sanfrecce Hiroshima, in which he also scored his first goal for the club. Pyshchur's league debut came in a 5–0 victory over Sogdiana Jizzakh on 4 March 2013 against, with Pyshchur scoring a hat trick in the game.

Taraz
On 21 February 2015 Pyshchur moved to Taraz, signing one-year contract with the club.

In July 2016, Pyshchur re joined Tararz after a spell with Navbahor Namangan.

Coach career
In 2019 he was appointed as coach of Desna-2 Chernihiv.

Personal life
His son Oleksandr Pyshchur is a professional football player from Chernihiv that recently moved to Puskás Akadémia II.

Honours

Club
Bunyodkor
Uzbek League (1): 2013
Uzbek Cup (1): 2013
Uzbekistan Super Cup (1): 2013

Individual
Uzbek League Top Scorer: 2013 (19 goals)
Ukrainian First League: 2008–09 (22 goals)

Career statistics

Club

References

External links
 
 

1981 births
Living people
Footballers from Chernihiv
Ukrainian footballers
Association football forwards
Ukrainian expatriate footballers
Expatriate footballers in Belarus
Expatriate footballers in Slovakia
Expatriate footballers in Uzbekistan
Expatriate footballers in Kazakhstan
Ukrainian expatriate sportspeople in Belarus
Ukrainian expatriate sportspeople in Slovakia
Ukrainian expatriate sportspeople in Uzbekistan
Ukrainian expatriate sportspeople in Kazakhstan
Belarusian Premier League players
Ukrainian Premier League players
Ukrainian First League players
Ukrainian Second League players
Slovak Super Liga players
Kazakhstan Premier League players
Uzbekistan Super League players
FC Dnepr Mogilev players
FC Metalist Kharkiv players
FC Metalist-2 Kharkiv players
FC Vorskla Poltava players
FC Hoverla Uzhhorod players
FC Volyn Lutsk players
MFK Ružomberok players
FC Zorya Luhansk players
SC Tavriya Simferopol players
FC Obolon-Brovar Kyiv players
FC Bunyodkor players
FC Taraz players
Navbahor Namangan players
FC Shurtan Guzar players
FC Avanhard Koriukivka players
FC Yunist Chernihiv players
FC Desna-2 Chernihiv managers